The 1858 United States elections occurred in the middle of Democratic President James Buchanan's term and marked the end of the transitional period between the Second Party System and the Third Party System. Members of the 36th United States Congress were chosen in this election. In the first election since the Supreme Court decided Dred Scott v. Sandford, the Republican Party won a plurality in the House, taking control of a chamber of Congress for the first time in the party's history. Although Democrats lost control of the House, they retained their majority in the Senate.

In the House, Democrats suffered a major defeat, losing seats to Republicans and a group of southern party members who opposed secession, running on the Opposition Party ticket. Although no party won a majority, Republicans won a plurality of seats. Republican William Pennington won election as Speaker of the House, becoming the first Republican Speaker.

In the Senate, Republicans picked up several seats, but Democrats retained a commanding majority.

See also
1858–59 United States House of Representatives elections
1858–59 United States Senate elections

References

1858 elections in the United States
1858
United States midterm elections